Patna Sahib Lok Sabha Constituency is one of the 543 parliamentary constituencies in India. The constituency is located in Patna district in Bihar. Until 2008, there was only one Lok Sabha seat for Patna, capital of Bihar. In the reorganisation effected that year, the city was awarded two seats, named Pataliputra (after the city's ancient name) and Patna Sahib.
The Voter-verified paper audit trail (VVPAT) system with EVMs was used for the first time in this Lok Sabha constituency in 2014 elections.

Vidhan Sabha Segments

Members of Parliament

1957-2008
See Patna Lok Sabha constituency.

2008-Present
In 2008, the Patna Lok Sabha constituency was divided into Patna Sahib Lok Sabha and  Pataliputra Lok Sabha.

Election Results

2019 Lok Sabha

2014

2009

See also
 List of constituencies of the Lok Sabha
 Patna (Lok Sabha constituency)
 Pataliputra (Lok Sabha constituency)

References

External links
Patna Sahib lok sabha  constituency election 2019 result details

Lok Sabha constituencies in Bihar
Politics of Patna district
2009 establishments in Bihar
Constituencies established in 2009